James Tormey (born March 13, 1839 in County Meath, Ireland), was a member of the Wisconsin State Assembly.

After residing in Big Bend, Waukesha County, Wisconsin, he settled in Tomah, Wisconsin in 1866.

Career
Tormey was elected to the Assembly in 1890. Additionally, he was a member of the Tomah common council and of the county board of Monroe County, Wisconsin. He was a Democrat.

References

Politicians from County Meath
Irish emigrants to the United States (before 1923)
People from Big Bend, Waukesha County, Wisconsin
People from Tomah, Wisconsin
County supervisors in Wisconsin
Democratic Party members of the Wisconsin State Assembly
Wisconsin city council members
1839 births
Year of death missing